Albert Ray Van Cleave (December 20, 1889 – September 24, 1987) was an American football coach, professor, and college administrator. He was the head football coach at Elon University in Elon, North Carolina for the 1926 season, compiling a record of 0–10.

Van Cleave was an alumnus of Union Christian College, Indiana State University, Indiana University, and the University of Chicago. He was also Professor of Philosophy at Elon during his time there. In 1943, he received an honorary degree from Elon. At the time he was President of Piedmont College in Georgia. He resigned in 1952.

Van Cleave died in Roanoke, Alabama in 1987. He was 97.

Head coaching record

References

External links
 

1889 births
1987 deaths
Heads of universities and colleges in the United States
Elon Phoenix football coaches
Elon University faculty
Indiana State University alumni
Indiana University alumni
University of Chicago alumni
People from Sullivan County, Indiana
Piedmont University
20th-century American academics